Dallinger is a surname. Notable people with the surname include:

 James Dallinger (1989-), New Zealand rower
 William Dallinger (1839-1909), scientist and British minister in the Wesleyan Methodist Church
 Frederick W. Dallinger (1871-1955), American Republican politician
 Johann Dallinger von Dalling (1741-1806), Austrian painter
 Johann Baptist Dallinger von Dalling (1782-1868), his son, also an Austrian painter
 Alexander Johann Dallinger von Dalling (1783-1844), his second son, also an Austrian painter
 Reinhard Dallinger (1950-), Austrian zoologist
 Maximilian Dallinger (1996-), German sport shooter

English-language surnames